Constellation HomeBuilder Systems is a Canadian company known for providing  construction management software and services for home builders and developers.

History 
Constellation was founded in 2004. The same year, the company acquired  NEWSTAR, FAST, and CFT to form Constellation HomeBuilder Systems. In 2005, the company hosted its first Customer Conference in Toronto.

In 2006, Constellation acquired Builder360 and BuildSoft. The same year, the initial public offering of Constellation Software was announced.

In 2008, Constellation got  certified by Microsoft. In 2010, the company acquired BuildTopia and Sales1440.  It also acquired Conasys Homeowner Care in 2014.

In 2016, Constellation  began offering customer satisfaction consulting and surveys with the addition of Woodland O’Brien & Scott. In 2017, the company unveils brand new products and services at PCBC 2017.

In 2019 - Constellation HomeBuilder Systems hosted the 9th Annual CustomerInsight H.O.M.E. Awards. In 2021, the company came up with a  technology that helps builders go digital and improve homebuying experience at IBSx 2021. In 2022, the company  introduced game-changing Industry Data Platform at Build Smarter Conference.

In January 2023, Constellation showcased  opportunities for the evolving homebuilder at IBS 2023.

Products and services 
Constellation HomeBuilder Systems provides software solutions for home builders and developers.

References

External links
 Official website

Canadian companies established in 2004
Companies of Canada
Business software companies